E. Susan Kellogg (born July 11, 1945) is an American educator. After serving as a university administrator and as a director at MetLife, she was appointed Maryland's insurance commissioner in June 1988, taking office the following month. She left after ten months, under pressure from state lawmakers and consumer advocates about rising car insurance rates. She currently serves as an adjunct professor of business at Virginia Military Institute, where she has faced claims of racial insensitivity.

References

1945 births
Living people
State insurance commissioners of the United States